Stafford is an unincorporated community, classified as a hamlet, in Clackamas County, Oregon, United States. It is a census-designated place (CDP), with a population of 1,577 as of the 2010 census. The community covers approximately  located in a rough triangle south of Lake Oswego, east of Tualatin, and west of West Linn. Students in the area attend the schools of the West Linn-Wilsonville School District.

Demographics

History

Stafford was named by George A. Steel, a prominent Portland pioneer, after his hometown of Stafford, Ohio, in the 1860s. The Stafford School opened in the community in 1892, and the following year the Eastside Electric Railway owned by Steel reached the area. In 1895, the Wanker family moved to the area and bought land where they built a store and tavern, an area later to become Wankers Corner at the intersection of Stafford Road and Borland Road. It has frequently been noted on lists of unusual place names. The two buildings currently located at Wanker's Corner are the Wanker's Country Store and the Wanker's Corner Saloon and Cafe. It is not a recognized community; it has never had a post office, nor does it consistently appear on maps of Oregon (although the AAA map of Oregon shows it in an inset). The United States Geological Survey classifies Wankers Corner as a "locale": "a place at which there is or was human activity".

Status
Parts of the Stafford area were proposed to be added to the Portland area's urban growth boundary in 1995. Eventually  were added, but later removed after a court fight that ended in 2001 at the Oregon Court of Appeals. In November 2006, the residents of Stafford voted 344–30 to form a hamlet, the second Oregon community to do so (after Beavercreek).

References

External links

Stafford official page at Clackamas County website
Stafford community website

Hamlets in Oregon
Portland metropolitan area
Unincorporated communities in Clackamas County, Oregon
Census-designated places in Oregon
1860s establishments in Oregon
Unincorporated communities in Oregon